Initiative 1000 (I-1000) of 2008 established the U.S. state of Washington's Death with Dignity Act (RCW 70.245), which legalizes medical aid in dying with certain restrictions. Passage of this initiative made Washington the second U.S. state to permit some terminally ill patients to determine the time of their own death. The effort was headed by former Governor Booth Gardner.

The measure was approved in the November 4, 2008 general election. 1,715,219 votes (57.82%) were cast in favor, 1,251,255 votes (42.18%) against. There were 2,966,474 votes total. 30 of the state's 39 counties voted in favor of the initiative.

In 1991, the similar initiative 119 was rejected by Washington voters by a margin of 54 percent to 46 percent. I-119 would have allowed doctors to prescribe a lethal dosage of medication, and also to administer it if the terminally ill patient could not self-administer.
Unlike that initiative, I-1000 requires the patient to ingest the medication unassisted.

The initiative is based on Oregon Measure 16, which Oregon voters passed in 1994 but was not implemented until 1997.  At that time, Oregon was the only other state to have enacted similar legislation. In 2013, Vermont became the third state to enact similar legislation. In 2016, California became the fourth state to enact similar legislation. All states on the West Coast now have similar legislation.

Specific provisions in the initiative
The official ballot summary for the measure, slightly amended following a February 2008 court challenge, is, "This measure would permit terminally ill, competent, adult Washington residents medically predicted to die within six months to request and self-administer lethal medication prescribed by a physician. The measure requires two oral and one written request, two physicians to diagnose the patient and determine the patient is competent, a waiting period, and physician verification of an informed patient decision. Physicians, patients and others acting in good faith compliance would have criminal and civil immunity."

Provisions in the law include:

 The patient must be an adult (18 or over) resident of the state of Washington
 The patient must be mentally competent, verified by two physicians (or referred to a mental health evaluation)
 The patient must be terminally ill with less than 6 months to live, verified by two physicians. 
 The patient must make voluntary requests, without coercion, verified by two physicians
 The patient must be informed of all other options including palliative and hospice care
 There is a 15-day waiting period between the first oral request and a written request
 There is a 48-hour waiting period between the written request and the writing of the prescription 
 The written request must be signed by two independent witnesses, at least one of whom is not related to the patient or employed by the health care facility
 The patient is encouraged to discuss with family (not required because of confidentiality laws)
 The patient may change their mind at any time and rescind the request
 The attending physician may sign the patient's death certificate which must list the underlying terminal disease as the cause of death

Supporters

The campaign was run by a coalition that includes former Washington governor, Booth Gardner. aid-in-dying advocates from Oregon, the Death with Dignity National Center, Compassion & Choices, Compassion & Choices of Washington, Compassion & Choices of Oregon. The name of the official political advocacy group working on the campaign was changed from "It's My Decision" to "YES on 1000".

State Senator Darlene Fairley, who chairs the Death with Dignity Disabilities Caucus, said that "as a matter of personal control and autonomy, it makes sense to let patients themselves decide what kind of medical care they want to receive and how long they want to suffer with a terminal illness."

State Representative Jamie Pedersen, chair of LGBT for 1000, said, "people facing terminal illnesses gain peace of mind from knowing that their end-of-life choices will be respected. Everyone deserves that respect and can appreciate its importance." Organizations that supported I-1000 include the American Medical Student Association, the American Medical Women's Association, the Lifelong AIDS Association, the ACLU, the National Women's Law Center, the Washington Chapter of the National Association of Social Workers, and the Washington State Public Health Association.

The Washington State Psychology Association was neutral on I-1000, but found that "patients choose aid in dying because of a desire for autonomy and the wish to avoid loss of dignity and control, not because of a poor mental state, lack of resources or social support," and "the law has had a positive effect in terms of significant improvements in palliative care."

The Newcastle News endorsed the measure in an October 7, 2008, editorial. "Some opponents of I-1000 will refer to the life-death option as assisted suicide, but this has no resemblance to suicide. It is a humane end to a life that is already ending," the editorial said.

Opposition

The Coalition Against Assisted Suicide opposed the measure. It included doctors and nurses, disability rights advocates and organizations, hospice workers, minorities, right-to-life organizations, the Catholic Church and other Christian organizations, and politicians.

The organization held that the danger of making doctors the agents of a patient's death far outweighed any advantages to assisted suicide, or safeguards in the initiative's text. They felt that legalization of assisted suicide would put pressure on minorities, the disabled, and the poor.
 
Actor Martin Sheen appeared in television ads opposing Initiative 1000. There has been some debate over one of Sheen's statements: persons with depression can be given a lethal dose without prior professional assessment. According to the Washington Death with Dignity act, "Medication to end a patient's life
in a humane and dignified manner shall not be prescribed until the person performing the counseling determines
that the patient is not suffering from a psychiatric or psychological disorder or depression causing impaired
judgment." This issue has been explored in the field of medical ethics.

Results

See also

 Act 39 in Vermont, the first state to pass a death with dignity law by legislative action
 California End of Life Option Act
 Oregon Death with Dignity Act, a ballot initiative passed in 1994 in the neighboring state of Oregon
 Baxter v. Montana, a court decision legalizing aid in dying in Montana.
 Washington v. Glucksberg, a 1997 Supreme Court decision upholding the State of Washington's Natural Death Act of 1979, a ban on assisted dying that the Death with Dignity Act repealed.
 Assisted suicide in the United States
 Compassion and Choices
 Voluntary Assisted Dying Act 2017 (Victoria)

References

External links
Official Washington State Department of Health page on the DWDA with Annual Reports
Ballotpedia entry on Washington Initiative 1000

In support
Yes! on I-1000 Committee
Death With Dignity National Center

In opposition
Coalition Against Assisted Suicide

Further reading
 Wall Street Journal: "Social Issues Dominate 2008 Ballot Initiatives," Aug. 7, 2008
 LA Times: "Washington's right to die battle is personal," June 22, 2008
 The News Tribune: "Death with Dignity initiative set for 2008," Dec. 5, 2007
 Associated Press: "Washington state mulls assisted suicide measure," June 16, 2008
 Seattle Times: "Identifying donors becomes issue in right-to-die campaign," June 16, 2008
 NewsroomAmerica.com: "Wash. Considers Assisted Suicide Measure," June 16, 2008
 Seattle Post-Intelligencer: "Playing God or dignified death? Faith-based groups taking crucial role in initiative battle" October 13, 2008

Assisted suicide
Death in Washington (state)
2008 Washington (state) ballot measures
Initiatives in the United States
Assisted suicide in the United States
Euthanasia legislation